Diran Manoukian (22 March 1919 – 5 May 2020) was a French field hockey player who competed in three Olympic Games.  With the French team he finished 10th in 1948, fifth in 1952 and 10th in 1960. Manoukian celebrated his 100th birthday in March 2019 and died on 5 May 2020.

See also
 List of centenarians (sportspeople)

References

External links
 

1919 births
2020 deaths
French male field hockey players
Olympic field hockey players of France
Field hockey players at the 1948 Summer Olympics
Field hockey players at the 1952 Summer Olympics
Field hockey players at the 1960 Summer Olympics
French centenarians
Men centenarians